La Pedrera or Pedrera (Spanish, 'quarry') may refer to:

Places
 La Pedrera, Amazonas, Colombia
La Pedrera Airport
 La Pedrera, Gijón, Asturias, Spain
 La Pedrera, Rocha, Uruguay
 La Pedrera, Rivera, Uruguay
 Pedrera, Seville, Spain
 Casa Milà, or La Pedrera, a modernist building in Barcelona, Catalonia, Spain

Other uses
, a Peruvian Navy ship

See also